Sheila Ewen Ritchie  (born 18 May 1957) is a  Scottish Liberal Democrat politician and solicitor, who served as a Member of the European Parliament (MEP) for the Scotland constituency from 2019 to 2020.

Career
She is a consultant (formerly partner) at an Aberdeen law firm, and was formerly a Councillor and the leader of Gordon District Council. 

She was a Scottish Government appointee to the European Economic and Social Committee between 2000 and 2003.

She is a Trustee of the sustainable land development non-profit, The Macaulay Development Trust.

Member of the European Parliament
Ritchie was elected as a Member of the European Parliament for the Scotland constituency in the 2019 European Parliament election. As a Liberal Democrat, she sat with Renew Europe group. From July 2019, she was a member of the European Parliament Committee on Budgetary Control and the European Parliament Committee on Agriculture and Rural Development. She served as an MEP until the 31 January 2020, when the Brexit process was completed.

Post 2020 
Ritchie stood in Moray at the 2021 Scottish Parliament election and was also the fifth candidate on the list vote for the Highlands and Islands region.

Ritchie was appointed Member of the Order of the British Empire (MBE) in the 2023 New Year Honours for political service in Scotland.

References

Further reading
Historical profile on the European Parliament site

1957 births
Living people
MEPs for Scotland 2019–2020
21st-century women MEPs for Scotland
Liberal Democrats (UK) MEPs
Scottish Liberal Democrat councillors
Members of the Order of the British Empire
Scottish solicitors